Elva is an unincorporated community located within the Municipality of Two Borders in south-western Manitoba, Canada.  It is located approximately 10 kilometers (6 miles) southwest of Melita, Manitoba. Manitoba Provincial Road 252 (PR 252) passes through the community, as does a railroad line.

References 

Unincorporated communities in Westman Region